The Canton of Le Marin is a former canton in the Arrondissement of Le Marin on Martinique. It had 8,547 inhabitants (2012). It was disbanded in 2015. The canton comprised the commune of Le Marin.

References

Cantons of Martinique